Ángel Oswaldo Fernández Vernaza (born 2 August 1971) is an Ecuadorian footballer. He played 77 games for the Ecuador national team between 1991 and 2004.

Club career
He played his entire club career in Ecuador. His main clubs were Emelec and Nacional Quito.

International career
Fernández was a participant at the 2002 FIFA World Cup and played at the Copa América 1991, 1993, 1997, and 2001.

International goals

References

External links

1971 births
Living people
People from Machala
Association football forwards
Ecuadorian footballers
Ecuador international footballers
1991 Copa América players
1993 Copa América players
1997 Copa América players
2001 Copa América players
2002 FIFA World Cup players
2002 CONCACAF Gold Cup players
C.S. Emelec footballers
C.D. El Nacional footballers
Barcelona S.C. footballers